Barren Fork may refer to:

Barren Fork (Boeuf Creek tributary), a stream in Missouri
Barren Fork (Brushy Fork tributary), a stream in Missouri
Barren Fork (Eleven Point River tributary), a stream in Missouri
Barren Fork (Little North Fork White River tributary), a stream in Missouri
Barren Fork (Collins River), a stream in Tennessee